Alessandro Motti and Marco Crugnola were the defending champions, but they did not start in this tournament.
Thiemo de Bakker and Raemon Sluiter defeated Pedro Clar-Rosselló and Albert Ramos-Viñolas in the final 7–5, 6–2.

Seeds

Draw

Draw

References
 Doubles Draw

Doubles